Scenes of Malaysian Life is a comic strip series by Mohammad Nor Khalid a.k.a. Lat.

In the 2000s the series ran three times per week in the New Straits Times.

References

 
Malaysian comics titles
Malaysian comics